John Reinhold "Chief" Bender (May 14, 1882 – July 24, 1928) was an American football player and coach of football, basketball and baseball. He served as the head football coach at Black Hills State University (1905), Washington State University (1906–1907, 1912–1914), Haskell Indian Nations University (1908–1909), St. Louis University (1910–1911), Kansas State University (1915), and the University of Tennessee (1916–1920), compiling a career record of 67–32–7. He is one of the few college football head coaches to have non-consecutive tenure at the same school. Bender was also the head basketball coach at Washington State (1907–1908) and Tennessee (1916–1917, 1919–1921), and the head baseball coach at Washington State (1907–1908, 1913–1915) and Tennessee (1917, 1920).

Playing career
A native of Sutton, Nebraska, Bender played college football at the University of Nebraska from 1900 to 1904. Due to loose eligibility standards at the time, he played five seasons for Nebraska. Bender starred at halfback for undefeated teams in 1902 and 1903, served as captain of the 1903 team, and graduated as the leading scorer in Nebraska history. However, tarnishing his image to some, one story recounts that he refused to play against the national powerhouse Minnesota until Nebraska paid him an acceptable amount of money.

Coaching career
After graduating from Nebraska, Bender served as head football coach at South Dakota State Normal School (now Black Hills State University) for one season before moving on to Washington State, where he was the head football and basketball coach between 1906 and 1908 and he posted a 13–1 record in football. His 1907–08 basketball squad also recorded a 12–3 mark, by far the best in school history to that point. Between 1908 and 1909, Bender coached football at Haskell Indian Nations University and from 1910 to 1911 he coached football at Saint Louis University. During the 1911 season, reporters in St. Louis commented that Bender looked like a charm doll called a Billiken, which were a national fad at the time. His squad became known as "Bender's Billikens," which is the genesis of SLU's athletic nickname. Bender returned to coach Washington State football from 1912 to 1914.

In 1915, Bender was hired as head football coach at Kansas State. In his one season at K-State, his team posted a mediocre 3–4–1 record. However, Bender left a lasting mark by instituting two long-term traditions at Kansas State in 1915: starting the annual homecoming event and adopting the nickname Wildcats.

Prior to the 1916 season, Bender moved to the University of Tennessee. At the same time, the sitting head coach at Tennessee, Zora G. Clevenger moved to Kansas State, in effect trading jobs with Bender. Bender served as head football coach at the University of Tennessee from 1916 to 1920. During his tenure, he compiled a record of 18–5–4 (.741). His best season came in 1916, when his team went 8–0–1, marred only by a scoreless tie against Kentucky. Tennessee did not field football teams in 1917 and 1918, and Bender posted his worst record in 1919, when his team went 3–3–3. In his final season, he went 7–2 and recorded Tennessee's 100th victory in football, with the two losses coming against Vanderbilt and Mississippi State. He is also credited with installing the short punt formation at Tennessee.

While at Tennessee, Bender also served as basketball coach for the 1917, 1920, and 1921 seasons, recording a 29–15 mark.

After his career at Tennessee, Bender served as a physical education instructor at the University of Houston. During this time, Bender also coached a volunteer football squad of students for the school. He suggested they be named the Cougars after one of his former teams, Washington State later adopted the mascot and nickname. In turn, the college's newspaper, The Cougar, followed suit when choosing its name. The university's athletics teams remain known as the Houston Cougars today.

Head coaching record

Football

References

External links
 

1882 births
1928 deaths
American football halfbacks
Basketball coaches from Nebraska
Haskell Indian Nations Fighting Indians football coaches
Houston Cougars football coaches
Kansas State Wildcats football coaches
Nebraska Cornhuskers football players
Saint Louis Billikens football coaches
Tennessee Volunteers baseball coaches
Tennessee Volunteers basketball coaches
Tennessee Volunteers football coaches
University of Houston faculty
Washington State Cougars baseball coaches
Washington State Cougars football coaches
Washington State Cougars men's basketball coaches
People from Sutton, Nebraska
Players of American football from Nebraska